Lishtar may refer to:
 Lishtar-e Bala
 Lishtar Rural District